The first cabinet of Constantin Sănătescu was the government of Romania from 23 August 1944 to 3 November 1944. During this period, Romania left the Axis powers and joined the Allies of World War II.

Ministers
The ministers of the cabinet were as follows:

President of the Council of Ministers:
Gen. Constantin Sănătescu (23 August – 3 November 1944)
Minister Secretary of State:
Iuliu Maniu (23 August – 3 November 1944)
Minister Secretary of State:
Constantin I. C. Brătianu (23 August – 3 November 1944)
Minister Secretary of State:
Lucrețiu Pătrășcanu (23 August – 3 November 1944)
Minister Secretary of State:
Constantin Titel Petrescu (23 August – 3 November 1944)
Minister of State Secretary for the Department of War:
Gen. Ioan Mihail Racoviță (23 August – 3 November 1944)
Minister of State Secretary for the Department of Foreign Affairs: 
Grigore Niculescu-Buzești (23 August – 3 November 1944)
Minister of State Secretary for the Department of Internal Affairs:
Gen. Aurel Aldea (23 August – 3 November 1944)
Minister of State Secretary for the Department of National Economy and Finance:
Gen. Gheorghe Potopeanu (23 August – 13 October 1944)
(interim) Gen. Constantin Sănătescu (13 October – 3 November 1944)
Minister of State Secretary for the Department of Labour, Health and Social Security:
Gen. Nicolae Marinescu (23 August – 3 November 1944)
Minister of State Secretary for the Department of Agriculture and Property
Dimitrie D. Negel (23 August – 3 November 1944)
Minister of State Secretary for the Department of National Culture and Religious Affairs:
Gen. Ion Boițeanu (23 August – 3 November 1944)
Minister of State Secretary for the Department of Public Works and Communications:
Gen. Constantin Eftimiu (23 August – 3 November 1944)
Minister of State Secretary for the Department of Justice:
(interim) Lucrețiu Pătrășcanu (23 August – 7 September 1944)
Aureliu Căpățână (7 September – 4 October 1944)
(interim) Dimitrie D. Negel (4 October – 3 November 1944)

References

Cabinets of Romania
Cabinets established in 1944
Cabinets disestablished in 1944
1944 establishments in Romania
1944 disestablishments in Romania
Romania in World War II